K78 or K-78 may refer to:

K-78 (Kansas highway), a state highway in Kansas
Abilene Municipal Airport